Tarcondimotus I (died 31 BC) was a Roman client king of Cilicia, who played a role in the Roman civil wars of the late Roman Republic.

Based on inscriptions relating to his family from Castabala, Tarcondimotus was the son of Straton. and had two sons called Philopator I and Laios, and a daughter called Julia.

Tarcondimotus at first supported Pompey in the civil war against Julius Caesar, but after Pompey's defeat and death, he was pardoned by Caesar and confirmed in his title and possessions. The name of Tarcondimotus' daughter is probably an indication that he received the Roman citizenship from Caesar as well. During the Liberators' civil war, he sided with Gaius Cassius Longinus, and after that with Mark Antony, whom he followed in the opening stages of the war against Octavian, adopting the royal epithet Philantonios (Antony-lover) as an expression of his devotion to Antony.

Tarcondimotus was killed in a battle at sea in 31 BC, fighting under Gaius Sosius against Marcus Vipsanius Agrippa. His sons deserted Mark Antony's cause after Octavian's victory in the Battle of Actium in 31 BC, but Octavian nevertheless deposed Philopator I in 30 BC from his kingdom. In 20 BC, Tarcondimotus' former possessions were restored to Tarcondimotus II, who is either the same person as Philopator I or a grandson of Tarcondimotus I. Tarcondimotus II lived until 17 AD. Shortly, after his death, the kingdom became a part of the Roman Empire.

References 

31 BC deaths
1st-century BC monarchs in Asia
Year of birth unknown
Kings of Cilicia
Roman client rulers
Monarchs killed in action